Anthene millari, or Millar's hairtail, is a butterfly of the family Lycaenidae. It is found in South Africa and Malawi. In South Africa, it is found in the Eastern Cape, the KwaZulu-Natal midlands, Gauteng, Mpumalanga and Limpopo.

The wingspan is 21–24 mm for males and 22–28 mm for females. Adults are on wing from October to January, with a peak in November. There is a single extended generation per year.

The larvae probably feed on Kalanchoe and Cotyledon species.

References

Butterflies described in 1893
Anthene
Butterflies of Africa